Damien Moore (born 26 April 1980) is a British Conservative Party politician. He is the Member of Parliament (MP) for Southport and a former Councillor on Preston City Council. He was elected in the 2017 general election with a majority of 2,914 votes, taking a seat previously held by Liberal Democrat John Pugh until his retirement. He served as Assistant Government Whip from September to October 2022.

Early life and education
Moore was born in Workington in Cumbria. He studied history at the University of Central Lancashire. After graduating, he worked in various roles in the retail sector, gaining promotion to be a retail manager for Asda.

He was first elected as a councillor for the Conservative Party on Preston City Council on 3 May 2010 for the Greyfriars Ward. Although the vote share for the Conservatives fell, he won by a large majority. He was re-elected with an increased majority on 5 May 2016. He has served as deputy leader of the Conservative group on the Council and as Chairman of the Preston Conservative Association. He unsuccessfully stood as the Conservative candidate in the Preston West division in the Lancashire County Council elections in 2013 and 2017.

Member of Parliament
Moore stood unsuccessfully as the Conservative candidate for Southport in the 2015 general election, losing to the incumbent Liberal Democrat John Pugh. After Pugh declined to stand again, Moore achieved a swing of 7.6% from the Liberal Democrats to take the Southport in the 2017 general election, becoming the first Conservative MP for the seat since 1997 and the first openly gay MP in the seat's history. The election also left him as the only Conservative MP in Merseyside. In advance of the 2018 Preston City Council election, Moore resigned as a city councillor to focus on his parliamentary work.  
 
Moore has voted for cutting ties with the EU consistently since becoming an MP.

On 11 September 2017, Damien Moore was appointed to the Petitions Committee. The committee assists members of the public in raising issues directly. In January 2018 he was also appointed the Science and Technology Committee.

In Parliament Moore chaired a number of All-Party Parliamentary Groups, including those on Tunisia, Blockchain, and the Benelux countries.

He was re-elected in the 2019 General Election with an increased majority. His election campaign was viewed as contentious as Moore claimed he had secured £25 million from the New Towns Fund for Southport, when in fact the town actually had only the opportunity to bid for up to £25 million.

Prior to his re-election, Moore was placed 611 of 650 MPs in the 2019 People-Power Index, a health check of how Parliament is working and how our MPs are listening to and engaging with, their constituents.

On 21 October 2020, Moore was the only MP from the Merseyside region to vote against extending the 80% furlough rate for people forced out of work in tier three lockdown areas, despite his own constituency and the entire Merseyside region being in tier three lockdown at the time.

Following his decision to vote against providing 80% furlough to workers, a local restaurant owner barred Moore from entering his premises.

Following Labour's motion calling to extend free school meals for the poorest children on 21 October 2020, Moore abstained and protestors sent a message of dissatisfaction by leaving paper plates with messages written on them outside Moore's office in Post Office Avenue, Southport.

In October 2020, A group of Conservative MPs in northern England launched a new campaign group, The Northern Research Group. The aim of the group said was to pressure the government to stick to their post-election pledge of "levelling up" the north by spending money and increasing infrastructure projects in the area. Moore signed up to this group. However, in a letter sent to the Boris Johnson from the Northern Research Group on the 26th October 2020 in which 41 named MPs expressed fears that the government's “levelling up” is being abandoned, Moore's name is absent.

Throughout his tenure as the town's MP he has been accused of censorship, deleting opposing views and users blocked from his social media accounts.

Personal life
Moore lives in Preston. He is openly gay.

References

External links

Profile at Preston City Council

1980 births
Living people
Conservative Party (UK) MPs for English constituencies
UK MPs 2017–2019
UK MPs 2019–present
Walmart people
Conservative Party (UK) councillors
Councillors in Lancashire
Gay politicians
English LGBT politicians
LGBT members of the Parliament of the United Kingdom
Alumni of the University of Central Lancashire
21st-century LGBT people